The Wheeler-Evans House is a historic site in Oviedo, Florida. It is located at 340 South Lake Jesup Avenue. On September 20, 2001, it was added to the U.S. National Register of Historic Places.

References

External links
 Seminole County listings at National Register of Historic Places

Gallery

Houses on the National Register of Historic Places in Florida
National Register of Historic Places in Seminole County, Florida
Houses in Seminole County, Florida